A post-literate society is a hypothetical society in which multimedia technology has advanced to the point where literacy, the ability to read or write, is no longer necessary or common. The term appears as early as 1962 in Marshall McLuhan's The Gutenberg Galaxy. Many science-fiction societies are post-literate,  as in Ray Bradbury's Fahrenheit 451, Dan Simmons' novel Ilium, and Gary Shteyngart's Super Sad True Love Story.

A post-literate society would differ from contemporary or historical oral cultures, which do not deploy writing systems and whose aesthetic traditions take the form of oral literature and oral history, aided by art, dance, and singing).  A post-literate society would have replaced the written word with recorded sounds (CDs, audiobooks), broadcast spoken word and music (radio), pictures (JPEG) and moving images (television, film, MPG, streaming video, video games, virtual reality). A post-literate society might still include people who are aliterate, who know how to read and write but choose not to. Most if not all people would be media literate, multimedia literate, visually literate, and transliterate.

The nonfiction books Amusing Ourselves to Death by Neil Postman and Empire of Illusion by Chris Hedges both observe a sudden rise of post-literate culture.

See also
Asemic writing
Cyberculture
Daniel Bell
Post-industrial society

References

Footnotes

Bibliography
 The Dawn of the Post-literate Age, by Patrick Tucker, THE FUTURIST Magazine, November–December 2009.
The Gutenberg Galaxy, Marshall McLuhan, University of Toronto Press, 1962
Empire of Illusion, Chris Hedges, 2009, 

Literacy
Science fiction themes